The girls' 5 kilometre classical cross-country skiing competition at the 2012 Winter Youth Olympics was held on 17 January at the Seefeld Arena.

Results
The race was started at 10:00.

References

Girls' 5 kilometre classical